Omigawa may refer to:

Omigawa, Chiba, a former town in Katori District, Chiba Prefecture, Japan
Omigawa Domain, a feudal domain in Chiba Prefecture, Japan
Omigawa Station, a railway station in Tōnoshō, Chiba Prefecture, Japan

People with the surname
, Japanese actress and voice actress
, Japanese mixed martial artist

See also
Ōmigawa Station, a railway station in Kashiwazaki, Niigata Prefecture, Japan

Japanese-language surnames